Etna is a borough of Allegheny County, Pennsylvania, United States, located across the Allegheny River from Pittsburgh. In 2019, Etna was recognized as the first ever Ecodistrict.

Etna was named after the volcano Mount Etna, an allusion to blast furnaces, steel mills, galvanized-pipe works, and other manufacturers located there. Historically it was a steel town with a blue collar community. The Isabella Furnace of Carnegie Steel was located in Etna, operating until 1953.

In 1900, 5,384 people lived in Etna. In 1940, 7,223 lived there. The population was 3,437 at the 2020 census.

Geography and topography

Etna is located at  (40.500338, -79.948755). It is located off Route 28 from Pittsburgh and borders the Allegheny river and Pine Creek.

Surrounding communities
Etna is almost entirely bordered by Shaler Township with its only other border being with the borough of Sharpsburg to the southeast. Nearby to the west is Millvale, Pennsylvania and Pittsburgh is immediately across the Allegheny River to the south.

Etna's school district is the Shaler School District.

Riverfront Trail
The Etna Riverfront Trail opened October 22, 2021. The Etna segment of the Riverfront trail project will connect via bike path to a series of Riverfront Parks including Millvale, The North Shore, Sharpsburg and Aspinwall.

Etna Riverfront

Etna Riverfront is a recreational area that borders the Allegheny River, with paved walking paths, lookout spots, benches and picnic tables.

Dougherty Nature Trail

Dougherty Nature Trail is a walking trail behind Dougherty Veteran's Field that runs along Pine Creek. Dougherty Nature Trail is accessible from Crescent Street by Dougherty Veteran's Field and a pedestrian bridge to Pine Street past the Etna Park.

Demographics

As of the census of 2000, there were 3,924 people, 1,749 households, and 981 families residing in the borough. The population density was 5,254.8 people per square mile (2,020.1/km2). There were 1,934 housing units at an average density of 2,589.9 per square mile (995.6/km2). The racial makeup of the borough was 97.78% White, 0.76% African American, 0.36% Native American, 0.15% Asian, 0.15% from other races, and 0.79% from two or more races. Hispanic or Latino of any race were 1.15% of the population.

There were 1,749 households, out of which 26.6% had children under the age of 18 living with them, 38.2% were married couples living together, 13.7% had a female householder with no husband present, and 43.9% were non-families. 38.5% of all households were made up of individuals, and 15.8% had someone living alone who was 65 years of age or older. The average household size was 2.22 and the average family size was 3.01.

In the borough the population was spread out, with 22.6% under the age of 18, 8.0% from 18 to 24, 31.7% from 25 to 44, 20.6% from 45 to 64, and 17.1% who were 65 years of age or older. The median age was 39 years. For every 100 females there were 89.1 males. For every 100 females age 18 and over, there were 84.6 males.

The median income for a household in the borough was $31,529, and the median income for a family was $41,577. Males had a median income of $31,386 versus $23,601 for females. The per capita income for the borough was $17,580. About 7.5% of families and 9.2% of the population were below the poverty line, including 12.0% of those under age 18 and 17.5% of those age 65 or over.

References

External links
 

Populated places established in 1868
Boroughs in Allegheny County, Pennsylvania